The Athletics at the 2016 Summer Paralympics – Women's 100 metres T54 event at the 2016 Paralympic Games took place on 9 September 2016, at the Estádio Olímpico João Havelange.

Heats

Heat 1 
19:01 8 September 2016:

Heat 2 
19:09 8 September 2016:

Final 
19:14 9 September 2016:

Notes

Athletics at the 2016 Summer Paralympics